Lim Sun-Young (Hanja: 林善永;  born 21 March 1988) is a South Korean footballer who plays as a midfielder.

Club career
Lim was selected in the priority pick of the 2011 K-League Draft by Gwangju FC.

References

External links 

1988 births
Living people
South Korean footballers
Gwangju FC players
Ansan Mugunghwa FC players
Jeonbuk Hyundai Motors players
Seongnam FC players
FC Anyang players
K League 1 players
K League 2 players
Association football midfielders
Sportspeople from Gyeonggi Province